Deaths of notable sports officials and players in 2021.

In each table, the names are listed in alphabetical order

January 

1

2

February

March

April

May

June

July

August

September

October

November 

1

2

3

4

5

6

7

8

9

10

11

12

13

14

Notes

References

Deaths of sportspeople in 2021
Sports by year
Deaths of sportspeople in 2021